Exeter Book Riddle 12 (according to the numbering of the Anglo-Saxon Poetic Records) is one of the Old English riddles found in the later tenth-century Exeter Book. Its solution is accepted to be 'ox/ox-hide' (though variations on this theme, focusing on leather objects, have been proposed). The riddle has been described as 'rather a cause celebre in the realm of Old English poetic scholarship, thanks to the combination of its apparently sensational, and salacious, subject matter with critical issues of class, sex, and gender'.

Text and translation

As edited by Krapp and Dobbie, the riddle reads:

Interpretations
The riddle is noted particularly for its rare (and unflattering) depiction of Wealas, a word which either means 'Brittonic people' or 'slaves', or both (Wealas is rendered in Treharne's translation above as 'Welshmen' and the rare but related term wale 'slave-girl ... from Wales'); the precise meanings here have occasioned extensive discussion.

The riddle is also noted for its implicit portrayal of sexual desire, which is rare in Old English poetry: the riddle seems to depict a slave and/or ethnically Brittonic person fashioning an object from boiled leather, but certainly does so in ways that evoke sexual activity.

There are a number of early medieval Latin riddles on oxen which stand as analogues to this one.

Editions
 Krapp, George Philip and Elliott Van Kirk Dobbie (eds), The Exeter Book, The Anglo-Saxon Poetic Records, 3 (New York: Columbia University Press, 1936), p. 186, https://web.archive.org/web/20181206091232/http://ota.ox.ac.uk/desc/3009.
 Williamson, Craig (ed.), The Old English Riddles of the Exeter Book (Chapel Hill: University of North Carolina Press, 1977).
 Muir, Bernard J. (ed.), The Exeter Anthology of Old English Poetry: An Edition of Exeter Dean and Chapter MS 3501, 2nd edn, 2 vols (Exeter: Exeter University Press, 2000).
 Foys, Martin et al. (eds.) Old English Poetry in Facsimile Project, (Madison, WI: Center for the History of Print and Digital Culture, 2019-). Online edition annotated and linked to digital facsimile, with a modern translation.

Recordings
 Michael D. C. Drout, 'Riddle 12', performed from the Anglo-Saxon Poetic Records edition (19 October 2007).

External links

 Cameron Laird, 'Commentary for Riddle 12', The Riddle Ages (7 September 2013).

References

Riddles
Old English literature
Old English poetry